|}

The Ascot Stakes is a flat handicap horse race in Great Britain open to horses aged four years or older. It is run at Ascot over a distance of 2 miles 3 furlongs and 210 yards (4,014 metres), and it is scheduled to take place each year in June on the first day of the Royal Ascot meeting.

Winners since 1988

See also 
 Horse racing in Great Britain
 List of British flat horse races

References
Racing Post:

Ascot Racecourse
Flat races in Great Britain
Open long distance horse races